Harry Bourchier (born 24 January 1996) is an Australian tennis player.

Bourchier has a career high ATP singles ranking of 279 achieved on 13 January 2020. He also has a career high ATP doubles ranking of 275 achieved on 2 March 2020.

Bourchier made his ATP main draw debut at the 2021 Murray River Open, where he was a late alternate into the singles main draw. He beat fellow compatriot Marc Polmans in the first round but lost to 13th seed Nick Kyrgios in the second round.

Personal life
Bourchier started playing tennis at the age of six.

Career

2012–2020: Career Beginnings
Bourchier made his debut on the ITF circuit at the Australia F5 in August 2012.

Bourchier won his first ATP Challenger Tour match at the 2014 West Lakes Challenger in February 2014. In March 2015, Bourchier reached his first ITF final in Mildura.

In February 2015, Bourchier reacher the quarter-final of the Launceston Tennis International. In March 2015, Bourchier reached his first ITF final in Mildura.

In 2019, Bourchier won four ITF singles titles.

2021: ATP debut
In January 2021, Bourchier lost in the first round of the 2021 Australian Open – Men's singles qualifying.

In February 2021, Bourchier made his ATP tour main draw debut at the Murray River Open in 2021. He won his first match against Marc Polmans in straight sets before succumbing to 13th seed Nick Kyrgios 2-6, 6-7(7).

ATP Challengers and ITF Futures finals

Singles:  (4–2)

Doubles: 12 (5–7)

References

External links

Harry Bourchier at Tennis Australia

1996 births
Living people
Australian male tennis players
Sportspeople from Hobart
Tennis players from Melbourne
Tennis people from Tasmania
Tennis players at the 2014 Summer Youth Olympics
21st-century Australian people